Wajih Tayeib Azaizeh (born 1955 in Irbid) is the Jordanian Minister of Political and Parliamentary Affairs. He was appointed as minister on 27 October 2022. Previously he had served as Minister of Transport from 7 March until 27 October 2022.

Education 
Azaizeh holds a Bachelor in Civil Engineering (1979) from the University of Aleppo.

Career 
In 2008, Azaizeh was the Director-General of the Palestinian Affairs Department. From 2012 until 2013, he served as Minister of Social Development.

Awards 
In 2007, Azaizeh received the Independence Medal of the First Order.

References 

Living people
1955 births
Government ministers of Jordan
21st-century Jordanian politicians
Transport ministers of Jordan

University of Aleppo alumni